Raphitoma azuari is a species of sea snail, a marine gastropod mollusc in the family Raphitomidae.

Description
The length of the shell attains 12.6 mm.

Distribution
This marine species was found off France in the Mediterranean Sea.

References

Sources 
 Pelorce J. & Horst D. (2020). Raphitoma echinata (Brocchi, 1814) et Raphitoma echinata sensu auctores sur la côte méditerranéenne du département des Alpes-Maritimes (France). Xenophora Taxonomy. 28: 28-35.
 

azuari
Gastropods described in 2020